From the Teeth of Angels is a novel by the American writer Jonathan Carroll, first published in 1994. It tells the story of three interconnected fates. The question of death is being discussed in this novel.

References

Novels by Jonathan Carroll
1994 American novels
Doubleday (publisher) books